O Noviço Rebelde is a 1997 Brazilian comedy film written, produced and starring by Renato Aragão. Directed by Tizuka Yamasaki, the film is a parody of the 1965 American film The Sound of Music. It was the highest-grossing locally produced film during 1998. It was shot in Beberibe, Ceará.

Cast
Renato Aragão as Didi
Dedé Santana as Dedé
Tony Ramos as Felipe
Patrícia Pillar as Maria of Heaven
Luma de Oliveira as Teresa
Cláudio Corrêa e Castro as Father Manuel
Sandy Leah as Marcia
Junior Lima as Junior
Alessandra Aguiar as Vicky
Wallan Renato as Dudu
Pedro Kling as Julinho
Gugu Liberato as Announcer
Chitãozinho & Xororó as Themselves
Roberto Guilherme as Colonel Pereira
Terezinha Elisa as Dalila
Thelma Reston as Zelda
Inês Galvão as Laura
Ary Sherlock as Father Antônio

References

External links
 

1990s parody films
1997 films
Brazilian comedy films
Films directed by Tizuka Yamasaki
Films shot in Ceará
Os Trapalhões
Brazilian parody films
1997 comedy films